The Wilsons Promontory National Park, commonly known as Wilsons Prom or The Prom, is a national park in the Gippsland region of Victoria, Australia, located approximately  southeast of Melbourne.

The  national park is the southernmost national park on mainland Australia, known for its rainforests, beaches and abundant wildlife. The national park covers the southern portion of Wilsons Promontory, a peninsula containing South Point, the southernmost point on the Australian mainland. A lighthouse on the south-east corner of the peninsula is the southernmost lighthouse on mainland Australia and has operated continuously since 1859.

The Park is highly popular with bushwalkers and campers, and has a number of lodges and serviced camping areas at a camping area near the mouth of Tidal River.

History
Indigenous Australians occupied the area at least 6,500 years ago based on archaeological records.

The first Europeans to sight Wilsons Promontory are believed to be George Bass and Matthew Flinders in 1798.

Extensive sealing took place at Sealer's Cove during the 19th Century, such that seals are no longer found there.

Lobbying by the Field Naturalists Club of Victoria and the Royal Society of Victoria (including Arthur Henry Shakespeare Lucas) led to the Government of Victoria temporarily reserving the area as National Park in 1898, made permanent in 1908. The original settlement in the Park was on the Darby River site, where a chalet existed.

The Wilsons Promontory was used as commando training area during World War II. A memorial to commandos who lost their lives in World War II is located at Tidal River.

A large section of the park was burnt out in April 2005 by a bushfire caused by a controlled burn that breached containment lines because of warmer and windier conditions than were forecast for that day, causing the evacuation of six-hundred people.

During the Black Saturday Fires of February 2009 throughout Victoria, trees in the Wilsons Promontory were struck by lightning, which then led to the loss of up to 50% of the national park through major fire damage.

Camping

Tidal River is the main location for accommodation and camping in Wilsons Promontory National Park. Tidal River Campground has 484 camping and caravan sites (including twelve powered sites) situated near the beach and river. There are also eleven remote walk-in sites located within the park.

Tidal River camping ground is nestled in sand dunes behind Norman Bay, on the western side of the peninsula. The only road open to visitors leads from Yanakie at the park entrance to Tidal River, a distance of 32 kilometres (20 mi). Yanakie is a dog friendly camp ground that can accommodate for large caravans as well as smaller tents. For those who wish to camp near Wilsons Promontory with their dog, it is a good alternative.

When fully occupied, the settlement of Tidal River swells to over 2,000 people. There is a visitor centre open daily, a general store which serves basic supermarket and emergency items, fish and chips and takeaway food. The outdoor cinema, established in the late 1940s, is a nostalgic favourite amongst summer campers who will sometimes line up for over an hour before tickets can be bought so they can save a seat in the front row with a blanket.

During summer, a ballot is held to allocate sites from Christmas until late January. Regardless of the time of year, all accommodation must be pre-booked.[3]

Wildlife

The Wilsons Promontory National Park is home to a wide range of wildlife species, including kangaroos, wombats, echidnas, emus, a wide range of small marsupials, and numerous species of birds, most prominent among which are the rosellas. Generally, the wildlife around Tidal River is accustomed to human presence, and many of the animals and birds near the campsites will approach humans, accept food from them, or even enter their tents uninvited. It is, however, illegal to feed wildlife and if one is found to be feeding them you will be issued with a fine by Parks Victoria staff.

Outside the camping area, the wildlife is less accustomed to humans, and may be more difficult to spot. Possums can be quite easily found with a torch at night, and kangaroos and emus are often seen in large numbers on either side of the road on the way in to the National Park. Swamp wallabies are frequently spotted on many of the walks, as are a variety of bird species. The northern section of the park is also home to an abundance of snakes.

Southern right whales nowadays show slow but steady recovery and started using the area as a nursery like what was used to be along with humpback whales that tend to pass through the area rather than long stay. Killer whales, dolphins, seals, sea lions, and penguins can be seen more regularly.

Hiking

The Prom has a number of different hiking trails. There are trails of differing levels of difficulty, including day hikes ranging from short strolls using beach access ramps up to longer two- or three-hour walks. There are also several overnight hiking options which can be combined into larger circuit hikes from 2 days upwards. There are also multi-day hikes in the northern section of the park which require walkers to have good navigational skills. A permit is required for all overnight hiking.
   
A portion of the peninsula is warm temperate rainforest. These areas are generally traversed on boardwalks and bridges and the wildlife includes several bird species and swamp wallabies. There is also some mountainous terrain. Mount Oberon affords views that are only mildly marred by a radio aerial close by. An alternative walk-up Mount Bishop also has panoramic views of the Prom. The coastline is ruggedly and has indented coves and beaches interspersed amongst granite headlands, tors and cliffs. Beaches vary from broad sandy littoral plains to steep coves and rock pools. The northern part of the park comprises a great deal of the Yanakie Isthmus with sandy healthlands.

Mount Oberon
Mount Oberon is also located in Wilsons Promontory National Park. Hikers sometimes take a vehicle halfway up the mountain to Telegraph Saddle car park and then continue on foot. Walkers follow the uphill management vehicle track to Mount Oberon's summit. A short series of steps below the summit's rocky outcrops, leads to views over Tidal River, the coast and islands offshore. It can be windy, cool and clouded over at the summit, even during the summer months.

See also

 Protected areas of Victoria (Australia)
List of biosphere reserves in Australia

References

External links

 

  

 Management plan

National parks of Victoria (Australia)
Biosphere reserves of Australia
Gippsland (region)
Bass Strait
Protected areas established in 1898
Wilsons Promontory
1898 establishments in Australia